The 2004 Lakeside World Darts Championship was the first World Darts Championship held after Imperial Tobacco were forced to withdraw their sponsorship. UK government legislation had banned tobacco companies from attaching their brands to sporting events from 2003.

The tournament had been previously known as the Embassy World Championship for 26 years since its inception in 1978. Bob Potter, owner of the Lakeside Country Club which hosts the event, stepped in to become the new title sponsor of the event. The prize fund for 2004 matched the previous year, with the exception of the non-qualifiers payments which were removed.

The championship was staged between 3–11 January. Andy Fordham became a new name on the trophy after defeating defending champion, Raymond van Barneveld in the semi-final and Mervyn King in the final. Fordham hit the highest 3-dart average in the final (97.18) since the PDC/BDO split in 1993 - although Phil Taylor and Eric Bristow had each surpassed that figure twice in their previous BDO title wins.

Prize money
The prize money was £199,000 for the men's event and £10,000 for the women's event.

Men's Champion: £50,000
Runner-Up: £25,000
Semi-Finalists (2): £11,000
Quarter-Finalists (4): £6,000
Last 16 (8): £4,250
Last 32 (16): £2,750

There was also a shared 9 Dart Checkout prize of £51,000, along with a High Checkout prize of £2,000 per event.

Seeds
Men
  Raymond van Barneveld
  Ted Hankey
  Mervyn King
  Tony David
  Tony West
  Martin Adams
  Gary Anderson
  John Walton

The Results

Men

Seeds

Women
  Trina Gulliver
  Francis Hoenselaar
  Claire Bywaters
  Karin Krappen

Prize money
The prize money was £10,000 for the women's event.

Women's Champion: £4,000
Runner-Up: £2,000
Semi-Finalists (2): £1,000
Quarter-Finalists (4): £500

The Results

Women

BDO World Darts Championships
BDO World Darts Championship
BDO World Darts Championships
BDO World Darts Championships
Sport in Surrey
Frimley Green